QS/1 is an American software company which develops management software for pharmacies. It was founded in 1944 and is based in Spartanburg, South Carolina.

In 1977, the company recognized health care professionals' need for software and hardware packages designed to help provide more efficient and effective care for customers and pharmacy patients. QS/1's first system was the QS/1 Pharmacy System, known as RxCare Plus, and was designed for the independent pharmacy market. QS/1's latest system, known as NRx, has added a more "Windows-like" GUI interface to the RxCare Plus system, continuing to develop easier methods of processing prescriptions.  

Today, QS/1 provides products, services, and support to a variety of health care providers with a primary focus on providing the industry's best software for managing independent retail, long-term care and outpatient pharmacies, as well as Home Medical Equipment (HME) and Durable Medical Equipment (DME) providers. Their employees develop software and train and support their customers through their broad network of North American field offices.

Also, PUBLIQ Software provides software and services for state and local governments, law enforcement departments, judicial offices, municipal utilities, and other offices.

QS/1 is also home to PowerLine, which provides insurance claim switching services through redundant data centers and networks for transmission to insurance companies. These redundant networks and data centers support prescription, electronic prescription and credit card transmissions. All traffic to these networks are encrypted between the pharmacy and the insurance company and supports the HIPAA privacy regulations.

In 2018, the company name was changed to Smith Technologies, combining QS/1 with Integra, LLC, based in Anacortes, Washington. The headquarters for Smith Technologies remained in Spartanburg, SC.

On April 1, 2020, Smith Technologies was purchased by private equity and became RedSail Technologies, with headquarters remaining in Spartanburg, SC.

Products 
SharpRx - QS/1's Next-Generation Retail Pharmacy System
NRx - Retail Pharmacy System
SystemOne - Home Medical Equipment (HME)/Durable Medical Equipment (DME) System
MSM - Multi-Site Management System
Enterprise - Multiple Stores at a Corporate Location
IVR - QS/1's Interactive Voice Response
Point-of-Sale - QS/1's Cash Management System
WebConnect - Allows long term care facilities to submit secure electronic updated patient information and submit refill prescriptions to the pharmacy 
WebRx - Integrated with the NRx system, it offers online prescriptions refills
Interfaces

External links

https://www.qs1.com/
https://www.qs1.com/about/our-story/
https://www.businesswire.com/news/home/20200401005511/en/Smith-Technologies-Completes-Acquisition-by-Francisco-Partners-and-Rebrands-as-RedSail-Technologies

Pharmacies of the United States
Health care companies based in South Carolina